is a 1979 Japanese pink film directed by Mamoru Watanabe starring Mayuko Hino and Naomi Oka.

Plot
In this Meiji period erotic costume drama, Shino (Mayuko Hino) has seen her step-mother Aya (Naomi Oka) take over the family inheritance and invite her petty criminal lover (Masayoshi Nogami) into the family home after the death of her father (Kōji Kokonoe). Shino leaves to go on the traditional temple pilgrimage around the island of Shikoku. During her pilgrimage, she is assaulted several times by bandits but eventually returns home disguised as a geisha to take her revenge

Cast
  as Shino
  as Aya
 
 Shirō Shimomoto

Production
Director Mamoru Watanabe made his debut with the now lost film Hussy in 1965. Virgin Rope Makeover is a remake of that film. Watanabe also made other films at this time working with actresses Mayuko Hino and Naomi Oka with Oka usually playing the mature woman luring the innocent Hino into sadistic adventures. He also continued to collaborate with screenwriter Banmei Takahashi in other pink films for Shintōhō Eiga.

Reception
Virgin Rope Makeover was awarded the Best Film award at the first Zoom-Up Awards given by the magazine of the same name in 1980. Director Mamoru Watanabe took the prize for Best Director and Mayuko Hino won for Best Actress.

Release
Virgin Rope Makeover was released theatrically in Japan in June 1979.

References

External links
 

1979 films
Pink films
Shintōhō Eiga films
1970s pornographic films
Films set in the Meiji period
1970s Japanese films